Black Tambourine was an American indie pop band and one of the earliest Slumberland groups of the early 1990s. Formed in Silver Spring, Maryland, the band comprised vocalist Pam Berry and instrumentalists Archie Moore, Brian Nelson and Mike Schulman. Along with Tiger Trap, Lois, Honeybunch, Tullycraft, and Beat Happening, they are considered to be one of the most influential bands of the American twee pop movement.

History
The members came to the project already acquainted with each other: Both Nelson (also of Big Jesus Trashcan) and Schulman were in Whorl together, while Schulman (also of Powderburns) co-founded Slumberland Records. Moore, meanwhile, was in Velocity Girl and played on early recordings by Lilys, and Berry had co-founded the Chickfactor zine.

The band was influenced by Phil Spector's Wall of Sound production style, the Jesus and Mary Chain, and the Shop Assistants.

Black Tambourine was described by Allmusic as one of the "seminal American indie pop bands of the 1980s."
`

Discography

EPs
By Tomorrow 7-inch EP (1991, Slumberland Records)
Throw Aggi Off the Bridge 7-inch EP  (1992, Audrey's Diary)
OneTwoThreeFour 7-inch EP  (2012, Slumberland Records)
Black Tambourine Cassette digital EP (2010, self-release)
Black Tambourine cassette EP (2012, self-release)

Compilation albums
Complete Recordings (1999, Slumberland Records)
Black Tambourine (2010, Slumberland Records)

Compilation appearances
"We Can't Be Friends" on One Last Kiss (1992, spinART)
"Pam's Tan" on What Kind of Heaven Do You Want? 7-inch EP (1989, Slumberland)

References

External links
Black Tambourine
Discography at Twee.net

Musical groups from Washington, D.C.
Indie pop groups from Washington, D.C.
Slumberland Records artists